Kristaps Zommers (born 7 January 1997) is a Latvian professional footballer who plays as a goalkeeper for SK Super Nova.

Club career
As a youth player, Zommers joined the youth academy of Aarhus Gymnastikforening in Denmark.

He started his career with Parma.

In the 2015-16 Serie D, Kristaps made 25 appearances and kept 17 clean sheets.

Local journalists were deterred by the fact that he cannot speak Italian fluently so his interviews were conducted in English.

In an interview with the Italian show Sports Bar, he said, "In football, you know, things may not always go smoothly; it only affects work and will continue to give my best in training. I am convinced, that our quality, in the long run, will come out." On 17 January 2019, he was released from his Parma contract by mutual consent.

In 2020, he signed for Nara.

Zommers returned to Latvia and signed with Valmieras FK on 10 September 2020.

In 2022, he signed for Super Nova.

International
Zommers made his Latvia U-21 debut versus Estonia in the Baltic Cup and is deemed the highest prospect in Latvian goalkeeping.

References

Living people
1997 births
Footballers from Riga
Latvian footballers
Latvia youth international footballers
Latvia under-21 international footballers
Latvian expatriate footballers
Association football goalkeepers
Parma Calcio 1913 players
Pordenone Calcio players
Cosenza Calcio players
FK Liepāja players
Imolese Calcio 1919 players
Nara Club players
Valmieras FK players
Serie C players
Latvian Higher League players
Expatriate footballers in Italy
Expatriate men's footballers in Denmark
Expatriate footballers in Japan
Latvian expatriate sportspeople in Italy